The Under-Gifted is a 1980 French teen comedy film directed by Claude Zidi.

Cast

External links
 
 

1980 films
1980 comedy films
1980s high school films
1980s teen comedy films
Films directed by Claude Zidi
French high school films
1980s French-language films
French teen comedy films
1980s French films